Peter Joseph Mallon (December 5, 1929 – February 3, 2007) was an archbishop in the Archdiocese of Regina from June 9, 1995, until his retirement on March 30, 2005. He retired in 2005, at the age of 75, due to the Roman Catholic church's mandatory retirement policy. He died in 2007.

References 

1929 births
2007 deaths
20th-century Roman Catholic archbishops in Canada
21st-century Roman Catholic archbishops in Canada
People from Prince Rupert, British Columbia
Roman Catholic bishops of Nelson
Roman Catholic archbishops of Regina